The Kinneloa Fire was a destructive wildfire in October 1993, in Los Angeles County, California. The fire burned 196 structures in the San Gabriel Mountains foothill communities of Altadena, Kinneloa Mesa, and Sierra Madre. At the time it was the 12th most destructive wildfire in recorded California history, and though it has since fallen well out of the top 20 statewide, it remains one of the most destructive wildfires in the history of Los Angeles County. The fire resulted in one fatality and a multitude of minor injuries: a death was caused by pneumonia complicated by smoke inhalation, though two indirect deaths resulted from debris flows in the burn area more than four months later.

The fire began as an escaped campfire and was driven by a combination of extremely dry and flammable fuels, strong Santa Ana winds, and rugged topography. Nearly all of the structure losses occurred on the first day of the wildfire, and more favorable weather along with the efforts of more than 2,000 firefighters soon confined the fire to the mountainous backcountry of the Angeles National Forest until it was contained on November 1. The Kinneloa Fire was one of the most significant of a rash of wildfires that broke out across Southern California in late October 1993, most of them driven by the same episode of Santa Ana winds. It burned simultaneously alongside the Laguna Fire in Orange County, the Green Meadow Fire in Ventura County, the Ortega Fire in Riverside County, and several others.

Background factors 
Wildfire behavior is commonly understood to be influenced by three significant factors: fuels (the receptiveness of vegetation and structures to carrying flames), weather (including wind, temperature, and humidity levels), and topography (including slope and elevation). Together, these factors make up what is called the wildland fire behavior triangle. The Kinneloa Fire, as with the other concurrent blazes, was driven by a combination of steep terrain, drought-stressed vegetation, and hot, dry Santa Ana winds.

Fuels 
In the autumn of 1993, California had experienced a full 6 years of severe drought (between 1986 and 1992), which contributed to a build-up of dead and dry brush on Southern California hillsides. This long dry stretch was followed by the wet winter of 1992–93, which allowed new grass and brush to grow in the spring and then dry out once more over the summer and fall.

Additionally, Southern California mountain vegetation is rife with species like chamise and manzanita, which comprise chaparral: one of the most fire-prone plant communities, containing flammable oils and resins and slow to rot or decay. Studies of historical charcoal records indicate that large wildfires driven by Santa Ana winds have long been a natural part of chaparral landscapes in the region, even accounting for human-driven changes in fire suppression and fire ignitions over time.

Homes constituted fuels, too: many houses that burned were highlighted by firefighters as being particularly susceptible because of their easily ignitable wood shingle roofs (often called shake roofs).

Weather 
On October 27, 1993, the National Park Service morning report noted:
 Red flag warnings are in effect for low humidity and strong north to east winds in much of central and southern California. A red flag watch also remains in effect for low humidity and gusty winds in northern inland valleys. Initial attack and possible large fires are expected to continue in California due to these conditions.
In Southern California, the red flag warnings for fire weather concerns were due to forecast Santa Ana winds. Santa Ana winds are a regular meteorological phenomenon in the autumn, generated when a high-pressure system builds in the Great Basin. The system pushes air clockwise, downwards from the northeast into the Los Angeles Basin, heating and drying it as it descends. The airmass also accelerates as it is forced through gaps in the mountains or over ridges, ultimately resulting in strong downslope winds.

In addition to the forecast winds of 15 to 25 miles per hour, temperatures on October 27 were forecast to reach the upper 80s to lower 90s (°F). The overall resulting weather pattern concerned regional fire officials, and the Angeles National Forest was closed for recreational purposes between October 27 and 29.

Topography 

The Kinneloa Fire occurred in the foothills of the San Gabriel Mountains, one of the Transverse Ranges formed where the San Andreas Fault breaks from its southwest/northeast path to dogleg west. Consequently, the San Gabriels also run east to west, rising up to 10,000 feet above the Los Angeles metropolitan area, and 'foothill communities' such as Altadena, Pasadena, Sierra Madre, and Arcadia directly abut the mountains on their northern sides. Because they are tectonically quite young, the San Gabriel Mountains are extremely steep and rugged, with many of the range's slopes at or beyond the angle of repose. Similarly, because the region is tectonically active, the slopes of the San Gabriels are largely composed of regolith, with an unstable and crumbling surface. They are often too steep and dangerous to directly attack fires on, especially when considering that wildfires tend to move faster uphill, driven by pre-heating of the air and fuel in front of and above the flames as heat rises.

Summary 
With (A) drought-baked vegetation inherently receptive to flames, (B) hot, dry, and strong downslope winds, and (C) rugged topography directly abutting dense residential neighborhoods, all three contributing components of extreme wildland fire behavior were primed to send a wildfire, strongly resistant to attempts to control it, directly into nearby communities. The lacking ingredient was an ignition.

Fire progression

October 27

Fire ignites 
The Kinneloa Fire began before dawn on the morning of October 27, 1993. It originated as an escaped campfire, built by a homeless man suffering from undiagnosed schizophrenia on the slopes of the San Gabriel Mountains above northeastern Altadena. Andres Huang, 35, was sleeping in a small grove of pine trees adjacent to the Mount Wilson Toll Road (a dirt road typically used by hikers), roughly halfway between Eaton Canyon and Henninger Flats, when he woke up cold and built a small fire from pine needles and twigs to warm himself. Huang's fire escaped the small circle of stones he had lit it in almost immediately. He attempted to smother the fire, but it had grown too large, and Huang fled.

Los Angeles County Fire Department (LAFCD) Station 66, located at the base of Eaton Canyon, received the first call about the fire at 3:48 a.m. PDT. It quickly became clear that the incident, quickly dispatched as the Kinneloa Fire (it is standard practice for the dispatcher or units on scene to formally name the fire after a nearby road, geographic landmark, or other feature of the landscape), had the potential to become a major fire. The LACFD requested the assistance of the Pasadena Fire Department within seven minutes of the initial call, and shortly thereafter the United States Forest Service (USFS) entered unified command with the Pasadena and Los Angeles County fire departments. County firefighters arrived on scene by 3:56 am, reporting a 2-acre 'creeping' fire in steep terrain. The Forest Service requested two helicopters for dropping water at first light, the soonest available flight time, as firefighting aircraft are generally not permitted to fly in the dark given the hazardous nature of operating in close proximity to thick smoke, steep terrain, and other firefighters. By 4:45 am, the fire was still only 3 acres.

However, the fire's behavior quickly changed as the sun rose and the Santa Ana winds arrived. Gusting to 40–60 miles per hour, it started to spread rapidly, moving along Mount Wilson Toll Road. The incident command requested air tankers. Around 5:30 am, the fire trapped and overran 15 firefighters on Mount Wilson Toll Road, though their deployment of fire shelters prevented any serious injuries. The fire began to move down through Eaton Canyon, and evacuations in nearby neighborhoods began. At 5:45 am, the Incident Command Post near Midwick Drive and Altadena Drive burned over, and had to be re-established at Eaton Canyon Nature Center. By 6:00, incident commanders were ordering engine strike teams (a strike team consists of five engines) for structure protection. The fire reached the arroyo at the bottom outlet of Eaton Canyon between 6:00 and 6:30. When it reached the arroyo, the fire split into two main flanks: one moved west towards Altadena, and one moved south towards Canyon Close Road. At around 6:10, the incident command post's new location at the Nature Center burned over again. Evacuations began for approximately 2,000 residents between Sierra Madre to the east and Altadena to the west. Saint Luke's Medical Center was included, resulting in the evacuation of at least 125 patients as well as at least 50 residents from nearby nursing homes. Temporary shelters were established at several local public schools, including Eliot Middle School, Wilson Middle School, and John Muir High School.

Fire progresses into neighborhoods 
The incident command post relocated for the final time to Victory Park. Even as Los Angeles County Fire Department helicopters arrived on scene to begin dropping water, structures in Altadena began to burn at 6:45 am. At the same time, the southern flank of the fire moved east, driven by the winds towards Kinneloa Mesa. The unincorporated community of Kinneloa Mesa consists of residential neighborhoods of single-family homes, sitting atop a broad mesa that emerges where the San Gabriel Mountains' foothills flatten out, carved by multiple steep canyons that drop down to Eaton Canyon on the west side and the neighborhoods of Pasadena Glen and Sierra Madre on the east side. The neighborhood contains many narrow streets (some only 18 feet wide) and multiple dead ends, making it a dangerous environment for firefighters—the Pasadena Star-News went so far as to call those streets "deathtraps". According to the Star-News, the chimney-like effect of the strong winds and pre-heating blew the fire up the canyon sides and into Kinneloa Mesa in just 90 seconds. Many homes, particularly those on the edges of the canyons, quickly caught fire. By 7:15, the fire was 300 acres, and by 8:15, more than 600 acres. As the fire behavior increased, it burned as much as 300 acres every 10 minutes.

At 8:00, thick smoke shorted out power lines in Kinneloa Mesa. This cut power to one of the water reservoirs operated by the Kinneloa Irrigation District, the local water company. Because Kinneloa Mesa sat above the surrounding terrain, keeping the reservoirs full required pumping water from wells further downhill. Without the power lines, and with no backup generators installed (for lack of funds), the District could not long maintain water pressure for long in the Kinneloa neighborhoods. Helicopters continued to drop water, refilling near Verdugo Hills Hospital in La Cañada Flintridge, but fixed-wing air tankers were unable to operate in the high winds after 9:30. As the day went on, other wildfires in Southern California grew into major incidents with resource demands of their own: 25 engine companies that had come from Orange County left for the Laguna Fire, under a mutual aid clause that allowed them to return in case of emergency. The Kinneloa Irrigation District water tanks were empty by 11:45, leaving firefighters unable to hook up to fire hydrants in the upper parts of Kinneloa Mesa. By noon, the fire was approximately 4,000 acres. Structures continued to burn throughout the afternoon along the fire's 8-mile perimeter, even as multiple homeowners remained to defend their properties with what they had on hand. The neighborhood of Pasadena Glen, below Kinneloa Mesa's eastern flank, went largely undefended; 27 homes burned there.

Winds subside 
In the afternoon, the Santa Ana winds subsided. Firefighters took advantage of the conditions, and by 5:00, most of the spot fires in Kinneloa Mesa were extinguished. Near sunset, firefighters made two simultaneous stands: 39 engines arrayed at Rubio Canyon stopped the fire there, though several homes were lost on Zane Grey Terrace, and more firefighters grouped at Park Vista Drive above Sierra Madre. After two hours of structure defense and setting backfires, they were able to prevent the fire from progressing into the neighborhoods to their south.

October 28 and beyond 
The National Weather Service forecast a return to Santa Ana winds on October 30–31: weaker than the October 27–28 episode, but still concerning to firefighters as multiple fires, including the Kinneloa Fire, remained uncontained. A Forest Service officer fretted that "This area burns very aggressively with no winds at all. I'm very worried," in advance of the winds. However, to the gratitude of fire officials, the predicted gusts of 40 miles per hour did not materialize.

The fire was 50% contained by the night of October 29, as firefighters shored up multiple flanks: to the west, above Altadena, they set a 200-acre backfire to strengthen control lines along Chaney Trail, which stopped the fire from continuing into Millard Canyon and threatening Jet Propulsion Laboratory and The Meadows subdivision. To the east, they used dozers to widen a large firebreak on the ridge between Little Santa Anita Canyon, with the most fire activity, and Big Santa Anita Canyon, which contained dozens of summer cabins and from which the fire might again threaten Sierra Madre. These efforts were supported by aircraft dropping water and fire retardant, including Boeing CH-47 Chinook helicopters—their use a first for Los Angeles County—and Lockheed C-130 Hercules fixed-wing aircraft.

By October 31, the fire was 95% contained, and on November 1, the Kinneloa Fire was declared 100% contained. At peak, at least 2,100 firefighters had worked to contain it.

Impacts

Casualties 
The Kinneloa Fire caused at least 38 people to suffer minor injuries, including 29 firefighters. The only direct fatality of the fire was Alfred Wagner, 98, who died on November 9 of pneumonia. The Sheriff's Department said the death was caused by complications from smoke inhalation that occurred on October 27, when Wagner attempted to defend his home near Eaton Canyon with a garden hose before being made to evacuate by his caretaker. The Los Angeles County District Attorney's office considered bringing involuntary manslaughter charges against Huang for Wagner's death, but ultimately declined to do so.

Two more indirect fatalities occurred when, after rains the following March, a father and son on a hike were killed by debris flows in a narrow canyon in the burn area above Sierra Madre. John Henderson, 33, and Matthew Henderson, 9, were caught unawares on an outing in Bailey Canyon when a presumed cloudburst over the scorched burn area led to a sudden and violent flash flood. Their bodies were swept into the Bailey Canyon Wilderness Park debris basin, and an exhaustive day-and-night excavation using bulldozers, backhoes, and dump trucks took 15 days to locate their remains under 18 feet of mud. Because the Kinneloa Fire was a proximate cause of the debris flow, Los Angeles County officials applied for aid from the Federal Emergency Management Agency (FEMA) to fund the search. However, these fatalities are not officially recorded as deaths from the Kinneloa Fire.

Damage 
The fire ultimately burned 196 structures. 121 of those structures were homes, and the remainder were detached garages, sheds, and other structures, including the Eaton Canyon Nature Center. An additional 40 homes were damaged. Dozens of vehicles were also lost. Kinneloa Mesa and its surrounding neighborhoods were fairly wealthy, and consquently several notable houses burned, including the Pasadena home of American football coach Johnnie Lynn, and the former residence of naturalist John Burroughs. The fire impinged on but did not burn the ranch and art colony of bohemian artist Jirayr Zorthian in Altadena.

The fire was called a "fire of the future" by Cal Fire officials and others, a slogan that grew in popularity in the late 1980s and early 1990s in California as the risky consequences of building in the wilderness-urban interface became clear in a series of destructive fires, including the 1988 49er Fire in Nevada County, the Oakland firestorm of 1991, and the 1992 Fountain Fire in Shasta County.

Political and economic impacts 
Multiple California politicians, including Senator Dianne Feinstein and Governor of California Pete Wilson, came to survey the damage in Altadena and Kinneloa Mesa. Wilson declared a state of emergency in Los Angeles County and compared the neighborhoods devastated by the Kinneloa Fire to the aftermath of the Oakland fire. In response to the wildfire outbreak, on October 28 President Bill Clinton in a speech declared five California counties disaster areas (including Los Angeles County) and promised federal assistance. He sent Federal Emergency Management Agency Director James Lee Witt, Secretary of the Interior Bruce Babbitt, and Secretary of Agriculture Mike Espy to Southern California to help coordinate emergency management and recovery efforts.

The Kinneloa Fire cost approximately $65.5 million, with $58.5 million sustained in losses, plus nearly $7 million spent on the suppression of the fire.

Post-fire landscape impacts 
After the fire, more than 63 miles of recreational trails and roads in Angeles National Forest were closed and not reopened until spring. Less than a week after the fire, county workers began spreading a mixture of seeds over 3,900 acres of the burn area. The seed mix included California poppies, deer weed, 'Cucamonga' California brome, rose clover, and non-native rye grass (which environmentalists opposed). The process was deemed necessary because of the risk of floods and debris flows—according to a member of the government rehabilitation team for the Kinneloa Fire burn area, something like 80% of the footprint burned at a high severity, leaving no vegetation to help hold the steep hillsides together.

During several different storms that spring after the fire, the National Weather Service issued flash flood warnings for parts of Altadena and Sierra Madre at risk from debris flows from the burn area. Many residents evacuated, including most of the residents of Pasadena Glen, a canyon neighborhood immediately east of Kinneloa Mesa. Around 2,000 cubic yards of material collected in the Kinneloa debris retention basin, one of several, over the following winter.

Legal proceedings 
Sheriff's deputies found and arrested Huang at 6:45 am, more than three hours after the fire had started, and he was arraigned on October 29. He was injured from running down the hillside through brush, disoriented, and severely dehydrated. He also spoke no English, complicating efforts by police to understand his story.

News reports often referred to Huang as a homeless man or transient hiker, but after talking with interpreters and probation officers, Huang's story emerged. He was born in China and had become a successful local official, but had fled to Peru, leaving behind a wife and daughter, disillusioned after Chinese Communist Party (CCP) crackdowns on democratic activism following the 1989 Tiananmen Square protests and massacre. He worked for an electronics company in Lima until he volunteered to establish a U.S. branch of the company, arriving in Los Angeles with a worker's visa in 1993.There, while living in a hotel, Huang fell and suffered a major head injury, losing consciousness. Over the following weeks, he began experiencing severe paranoia and recurring blackouts, resulting in the loss of his job. Huang could not even recall how he ended up on the mountainside where he started the campfire. Psychiatrists at Metropolitan State Hospital later diagnosed Huang with multiple conditions, including major depression, schizophrenia, and brain lesions.

On November 29, Huang pled no contest to the misdemeanor charge of starting an illegal open fire. He remained in a mental hospital until his sentencing in December. On December 21, Huang was released from jail and sentenced to three years of probation, under the condition that he receive treatment at the Asian Pacific Residential Treatment Center.

See also 
Following fires in the area included these:

 Station Fire (2009)
 Bobcat Fire (2020)

Notes

References 

Wildfires in Los Angeles County, California
Angeles National Forest
1993 meteorology
October 1993 events in the United States
1990s wildfires in the United States
1993 in California